is a professional Japanese baseball player. He plays pitcher for the Hiroshima Toyo Carp.

External links

 NPB.com

1982 births
Living people
Baseball people from Kyoto Prefecture
Japanese baseball players
Nippon Professional Baseball pitchers
Hiroshima Toyo Carp players